The Manila–Cavite Expressway (more popularly known as CAVITEX), signed as E3 of the Philippine expressway network and R-1 of Metro Manila's arterial road network, is a  controlled-access toll expressway linking Manila to the southern province of Cavite in the Philippines. At its north end, it feeds into and from Roxas Boulevard in the city of Parañaque in Metro Manila, also part of R-1. At the south end, it splits into two termini, both along the north coast in Kawit, Cavite. The first feeds into the intersection of Tirona Highway and Antero Soriano Highway. The second southern terminus is on the intersection of Tirona Highway, Antero Soriano Highway and Covelandia Road in Kawit, Cavite.

The expressway also serves as a major utility corridor, carrying various high voltage power lines and water pipelines across the densely populated areas of Parañaque and Las Piñas. The final section of the Dasmariñas–Las Piñas Transmission Line and Las Piñas substation of National Grid Corporation of the Philippines (NGCP) were placed beside the highway. Meralco also has subtransmission lines on tall steel poles placed along the highway, and Maynilad also has pipelines along the route.

CAVITEX is operated and maintained by the Public Estates Authority Tollway Corporation (PEATC), a non-chartered government-owned and controlled corporation (GOCC), a subsidiary of the Public Estates Authority (PEA), a government agency under the Office of the President, and is in a joint venture with the Cavite Infrastructure Corporation, a unit of Metro Pacific Investments Corporation (MPIC).

Route description

The Manila–Cavite Expressway follows a mostly curving route on the southwestern shore of Manila Bay, and the Bacoor–Kawit extension is built on reclaimed land near the coastal barangays of Bacoor. The road uses a barrier toll system, which involves toll barriers at entry points and no toll collection at the exit points, except at the Kawit and Parañaque toll plazas. The expressway is a physical extension of Roxas Boulevard. Lane count is usually 4 lanes for the NAIA Road–Bacoor section (the original route of the expressway known as Coastal Road) per direction and 2 lanes at the Bacoor–Kawit segment (known as the Kawit extension) per direction.

The expressway starts at the traffic light intersection with NAIA Road, Roxas Boulevard, and New Seaside Drive in Barangay Tambo. Past the intersection is an eastbound entrance and westbound exit of NAIA Expressway, opened in 2016. The only at-grade intersection of the expressway then comes at its intersection with Pacific Avenue, where southbound motorists are also carried by the Pacific Avenue flyover. An entry point to the northbound from the Kabihasnan area of Parañaque is found before the approach to the Parañaque toll plaza. The expressway widens on approach to the Parañaque toll plaza, where tolls for southbound motorists are collected. After Parañaque toll plaza is a right-in/right-out interchange with the Circumferential Road 5 (C-5) Extension, which is accessible only from the northbound direction. The expressway then enters the province of Cavite and passes Bacoor Exit, the original end of the expressway at Bacoor, where the original alignment involved a curve that was changed to a full interchange with the opening of the Kawit extension. CAVITEX past Bacoor Exit becomes a four-lane dual carriageway on reclaimed land built on the shores of seaside barangays of Bacoor. The expressway widens at approach to the Kawit toll plaza, where the end of the expressway is moved from the opening of the Kawit extension in 2011. The terminus at Kawit is a box intersection with Tirona Highway, Covelandia Road, and Antero Soriano Highway, which is the physical extension of the existing expressway. The end of the expressway at Kawit will accommodate the Cavite end of the under-construction Cavite–Laguna Expressway.

History

Proposed Cavite Boulevard

Even before the conception of the expressway, the Cavite Boulevard was planned by Architect Daniel Burnham to connect the city of Manila with the province of Cavite as part of his plan to beautify the city. However, the present-day Roxas Boulevard, a part of this plan, was built up to Parañaque only.

As an untolled road
In the 1970s, traffic congestion was a daily occurrence in the narrow stretch of land in Parañaque and Las Piñas going to nearby provinces, particularly Cavite. The Philippine government proposed a major road network that would link Roxas Boulevard to all other parts of Metro Manila and the Southern Tagalog provinces. Originally named as the Manila–Cavite Coastal Road, it was renamed to Aguinaldo Boulevard in 1989.

The road deteriorated so fast that there was a need to upgrade the road and upgrade the same to toll standards. This led to the Manila-Cavite Toll Expressway Project (MCTEP), more popularly known as “Coastal Road”. It is a joint venture project of the Public Estates Authority (now called Philippine Reclamation Authority) and the Malaysian group of Majlis Amanah Rakyat (Mara) and Renong Berhad (Renong).

As an expressway

The groundbreaking of the new expressway was held on September 14, 1995. On July 26, 1996, the Toll Operation Agreement between the Republic of the Philippines (acting through the Toll Regulatory Board), Public Estates Authority and UEM-Mara Philippines Corporation was signed. It was under this Agreement that PEA Tollway Corporation (PEATC) was created. Under the Agreement, PEATC is to undertake and perform the obligations of PEA which is principally the Operation and Maintenance of the toll roads or any segment thereof. Commercial operations started on May 24, 1998.

On 2005, the construction of the expressway's  extension from Bacoor to Kawit, Cavite, known as the Segment 4 of R1 Expressway Extension, was started; it was inaugurated on April 27, 2011 and formally opened to motorists on May 1. In 2015, the C-5 Road was extended south to connect to the northbound lanes of the expressway in Las Piñas.

On November 14, 2006, an Operations and Maintenance Agreement was signed among the Philippine Reclamation Authority, UEM-Mara Philippines Corporation (UMPC), and the Toll Regulatory Board, giving UMPC participation in the Operations and Maintenance of the expressway.

On December 28, 2016, the access ramps connecting Coastal Road and NAIA Expressway opened to motorists coming from Cavite and Las Piñas for easier access to NAIA Terminals 1, 2, and 3 and vice versa.

The Pacific Avenue flyover, which was planned in 2016, started construction in 2017 and was expected to be complete by March 2018. However, due to difficulties in transporting equipment and the location of the flyover between the north end of the expressway and the Parañaque Toll Plaza, the completion date was moved to August 2018. The flyover eliminated the signalized intersection for vehicles bound for Diosdado Macapagal Boulevard via Pacific Avenue, and improve the traffic situation around the said intersection.

As of June 2018, the expressway is being expanded with the construction of additional lanes on the NAIA–Zapote segment.

Future

C-5 connection

It entails the construction of a  flyover between the C-5 Road in Taguig and the C-5 Road Extension in Pasay (near Merville, Parañaque) over the South Luzon Expressway and Skyway. The second phase includes the completion of the C-5 Road Extension from Merville to Las Piñas and the construction of an interchange with Coastal Road in Parañaque. It is a component of Expressway 2.

The construction of the  CAVITEx–C5 South Link project started on May 8, 2016. Phase 1 was opened to traffic on July 23, 2019 and completion of the project is expected in 2022.

NLEX Harbor Link connection 
A proposal to connect the NLEX Harbor Link in Navotas with CAVITEX near Pacific Avenue was revealed by NLEX Corporation to connect NLEX to CAVITEX seamlessly. The expressway will be a 6-lanes elevated expressway (on the majority of the expressway above R-10 and R-1) and built in phases. When this first phase of this expressway is completed, motorists from western Manila will have direct access to NLEX and soon to CAVITEX when the entire expressway is completed.

Segment 5 
Metro Pacific Investments Corporation submitted a proposal to the Toll Regulatory Board to extend the expressway from Kawit to Noveleta, as well as an extension further west up to Tanza and north up to Cavite City. The  extension is estimated to cost . A part of the R1 Expressway Extension project that includes the existing Segment 4 (Zapote–Kawit segment), the project proposal also includes a spur road accommodating vehicles from the Cavite Export Processing Zone.

Sangley Point extension 
A proposal to extend the expressway from Kawit to Sangley Point Airport in Cavite City was submitted to the Department of Public Works and Highways in 2017 by CAVITEx Holdings, Inc. The proposed project aims to construct a  viaduct. Its cost is yet to be determined as it awaits approval from the government. It is not to be confused with Segment 5.3, which will branch from Noveleta to Cavite City.

Toll
The expressway features a limited number of interchanges. The original south terminus of the expressway in Bacoor has been converted into a full trumpet interchange. There are two toll barriers on the expressway: the original barrier in Parañaque and the extension barrier in Kawit. The expressway also features a one-way mini toll booth feeding into the expressway from Quirino Avenue, Parañaque. Vehicles are charged a flat toll rate based on vehicle class.

The expressway uses a barrier toll system that uses toll barriers at entry points, where motorists pay a fixed toll rate. The two large toll plazas, such as those found in Parañaque and Kawit, and the Kabihasnan entry are the toll collection points for the expressway. There are no toll collection at the exit points, except at the Kawit and Parañaque toll plazas. PEATC has also incorporated a near-field communication prepaid card it calls E-TAP. The Expressway also now accepts an electronic toll collection (ETC) system called Easytrip RFID, which currently manages ETC for the North Luzon Expressway, Subic–Clark–Tarlac Expressway, and Cavite–Laguna Expressway. ETC collections are done on both dedicated lanes and mixed lanes at the toll barriers.

Tolls are assessed in each direction at each barrier, based on class. In accordance with law, all toll rates include a 12% value-added tax.

Exits

Sangley Extension

Segment 5

Notes

References

External links 

 Cavite Expressway
 PEATC

Toll roads in the Philippines
Roads in Metro Manila
Roads in Cavite